Patrik Jordan Mathews (born 1993) is a Canadian white supremacist and former Armed Forces Reserve combat engineer. In 2021, he was sentenced in the United States to 9 years in prison for his involvement in The Base, a neo-Nazi and far-right accelerationist group that has been described as terrorist organization.

Career
Mathews served eight years in the Canadian Armed Forces as a combat engineer in the 38 Canadian Brigade Group and held the rank of Master corporal. He was discharged from the military after his ties to The Base were revealed in 2019.

Arrest

In 2019, Mathews was exposed as a member of The Base through evidence found by Winnipeg Free Press journalist Ryan Thorpe. On August 19, 2019, the RCMP obtained a search warrant at his home in Beausejour, Manitoba where they seized guns. In July 2019, the Canadian Armed Forces launched an investigation. Mathews went missing on August 24, 2019. His truck was found abandoned in Piney, Manitoba. On January 16, 2020, Mathews was arrested in Delaware by the FBI. Mathews along with two other men who were also arrested were believed to be planning to attend the 2020 VCDL Lobby Day rally in Richmond, Virginia.
In October 2021, Mathews was sentenced to 9 years in an American prison for his role in The Base, including allegedly plotting a mass killing. As of February 2022, Mathews is serving his sentence at United States Penitentiary, Terre Haute in Indiana, his projected release date is September 16, 2027.

References

1993 births
Living people
Canadian neo-Nazis
Canadian Army personnel